Shepperlands Farm is a   nature reserve north-west of Finchampstead in Berkshire. It is managed by the Berkshire, Buckinghamshire and Oxfordshire Wildlife Trust.

Geography and site

Shepperlands Farm has a wildflower meadow, an area of woodland and a patch of heathland.

Fauna

The site has the following fauna:

Mammals

Roe deer
Red fox
European badger

Reptiles and amphibians

Vipera berus
Grass snake
Anguis fragilis
Zootoca vivipara

Invertebrates

Aricia agestis
Polyommatus icarus
Melanargia galathea
Anthocharis cardamines
Favonius quercus
Leptophyes punctatissima
Limenitis camilla
Enallagma cyathigerum
Vanessa atalanta

Birds

Eurasian blue tit
Eurasian treecreeper
Buteo buteo
Caprimulgus europaeus

Flora

The site has the following flora:

Trees

Quercus robur
Birch

Plants

Sorrel
Erica tetralix
Lychnis flos-cuculi
Cardamine pratensis
Calluna vulgaris
Potentilla erecta
Vicia cracca
Lotus corniculatus
Ranunculus

References

Parks and open spaces in Berkshire
Nature reserves in Berkshire
Berkshire, Buckinghamshire and Oxfordshire Wildlife Trust